Three-time defending champion Rafael Nadal defeated Roger Federer in a rematch of the previous two years' finals, 7–5, 7–5 to win the singles tennis title at the 2008 Monte-Carlo Masters. He did not lose a single set in the entire tournament.

Seeds
The top eight seeds receive a bye into the second round.

Draw

Finals

Top half

Section 1

Section 2

Bottom half

Section 3

Section 4

External links
Draw
Qualifying draw

Singles